The Frog is a crime and mystery series written, edited and directed by Houman Seyyedi and produced by Ali Asadzadeh, produced in 2020–2021 in Iran. This series is the first series made by Houman Seyyedi, the first episode of which was supposed to be released on December 15, 2020, but the broadcast of this series was stopped by court order. Finally, the first part of this series was released on December 23, 2020.

Plot

On the Chaharshanbe Suri day, three friends named Ramin (Saber Abr), Farid (Ashkan Hassanpour), and Javad (Shahrooz Del Afkar) after stealing the weapon of a wounded officer, rob Noori (Navid Mohammadzadeh), Ramin's childhood classmate, who has become a rich and mysterious man...

Cast

Production
The Frog series is the first series directed by Houman Seyyedi and is also Navid Mohammadzadeh's first series. The Frog, which started filming in 2019 and stopped production due to the outbreak of the Coronavirus, ended its filming in the summer of 2020 and was written in 15 episodes. The filming of the Frog project took about two years.

Distribution
Negotiations were held for the release of the series on the Netflix platform, but no agreement was reached, and the series was finally released on the Namava platform. The first episode of this series was a free impression of the film La Haine. 48 hours after the release of this episode, the series set a record with 40 million views in Iranian home video.

Episodes

Reception

Critical response
Massoud Farasati criticized the series in Haft program and said:

Brian O’Shea, CEO of The Exchange:

Awards and nominations

References

External links
 
 

Iranian television series
Islamic Republic of Iran Broadcasting original programming